The 2019 season of Survivor: VIP is the ninth season overall of the Israeli reality program Survivor and the second VIP season. The season featured 18 celebrity contestants competing against each other for the 1 million NIS prize. The season was filmed in the Philippines between August and October 2018, and aired on Reshet 13 on March 9, 2019 until July 13, 2019, when former footballer Đovani Roso was named the Sole Survivor over previous Survivor winner Naama Kasry and plus-sized model Simcha Gueta during the live finale; Kasry was named the audience's favourite player after winning a public vote.

This marks the third season to include celebrities, following the 2012 Survivor VIP season and the half-celebrity Survivor: Honduras. With the inclusion of Kasry as the season's sole returning player, this season is the second overall to include former players, after Survivor: Fans vs. Survivors. This was the first season to air on Reshet 13 following the closure of Channel 2, and the third consecutive season to air on Reshet.

This season reintroduced duels, in which two castaways were sent to a secluded location immediately following the immunity challenge to compete for a reward, as last seen in the fifth season. Before the merge, one castaway from each tribe was sent to compete; if the representative from the tribe that won the immunity challenge won the duel, they would cast a vote for the losing tribe's upcoming Tribal Council on behalf of their tribe, which was publicly revealed at the start of the losing tribe's individual immunity challenge. After the merge, the immunity challenge winner chose the two duelists. The winner spun a wheel to earn one of three prizes, while the loser received a corresponding punishment.

Contestants

Notes

Season summary

Voting history

References

External links
  

Survivor (Israeli TV series)
2019 Israeli television seasons
Television shows filmed in the Philippines